William James McAuley III (born July 18, 1975), best known by his performing name, Bleu, is an American musician, singer, songwriter and record producer. He has written and produced songs for Demi Lovato, Selena Gomez, John Oates, Michelle Branch, Hey Violet, Big Freedia, and the Jonas Brothers, and has won multiple Independent Music Awards for his work with Air Traffic Controller.

In addition to his solo act, for which he was signed to Columbia Records, McAuley has been in a number of bands over the years, including a duo with Alexz Johnson called Johnson & McAuley, Electric Light Orchestra-style power pop band LEO, and a Mutt Lange homage super-group called LoudLion with Taylor Locke of Rooney and Allison Robertson of The Donnas.

McAuley's songs have been featured on soundtracks like Spider-Man and The Hills Have Eyes 2. In 2014, he wrote and produced all the soundtrack songs for Tinker Bell and the Legend of the Neverbeast, one of which is a duet featuring himself and KT Tunstall on vocals.

Career

Early career
Bleu graduated from the Berklee College of Music in Boston, Massachusetts. Bleu was known in the local Boston music scene for his live shows and work with other musicians, and received some local notoriety for his debut effort A Bing Bang Holidang, which was a charity benefit for the Boston Institute for Arts Therapy.  A single from that record, "Boston All Star 12 Dayz," received some local airplay, featuring famous local musicians and acts from Guster and The Mighty Mighty Bosstones as well as Kay Hanley of Letters to Cleo and Bill Janovitz.

Bleu would soon follow with his Workaday Day EP before releasing his first proper album, Headroom.  Released via Lunch Records, it received generally positive reviews, but did not take off until Bleu's entry into the WBCN Rock & Roll Rumble, which he won in 2001.  This led him to local opening slots with Jump, Little Children and Ben Folds.  He would later win a Boston Music Award for "Best Boston Band" (as well as be nominated for 5 in his career), and land a major label contract.

Redhead
Bleu's next album, Redhead (called "an all around power pop treat" by music critic Aidin Vaziri), was released in 2003 on Aware Records.  Two versions were released; both featured the song "Somebody Else," which was also on the Spider-Man soundtrack.  The first version of the album featured a song, "Sayonara," which had backing vocals from Puffy AmiYumi, and the latter version (released on Columbia Records) contained the single "Get Up," which received moderate national airplay.  The album was also released in Japan with the Puffy AmiYumi guest spot featured, followed by a short tour in Japan.

Departure from label, Alpacas Orgling, and other projects
Bleu parted ways with Aware Records after a public dispute about the direction of submitted demos, and his third studio album, tentatively titled A Watched Pot, was not released by the label.

In 2006, a side project with Matt Mahaffey of Self called L.E.O. was released.  Featuring contributions from Mike Viola, Andy Sturmer (formerly of Jellyfish), Hanson, and Jason Scheff of Chicago, Alpacas Orgling was meant to be similar to 1970s AM radio pop music, and is described by the band as an "alt-pop version of the Traveling Wilburys."

In July 2007, Bleu released two EPs on iTunes.  One is a collection of songs he wrote for friends and family members for their birthdays, simply titled Happy Birthday.  The other is credited to the band Blizzard of '05 (also the name of the album).  The 7-song EP was recorded by Bleu, some friends, and some former bandmates when they converted the basement of one of their houses into a recording studio, and holed up there during the Blizzard of '05, which swept across New England and shut down the city of Boston for five days.

In July 2008, Bleu and frequent collaborators Mike Viola and Ducky Carlisle released Aquavia as a band called The Major Labels.

Also in 2008, Bleu regained the rights to A Watched Pot. It was released on July 14, 2009, through Artist Garage and Fontana Distribution.

Another side project is a take on '80s rock called LoudLion (plays covers and originals), which plans to release a CD in 2011.

Bleu is also an in-demand songwriter and producer, working with such artists as Demi Lovato, Selena Gomez, Big Freedia, the Jonas Brothers, Boys Like Girls, and Michelle Branch among many more major label and independent acts.

Four
In August 2010, Bleu made the decision to use Kickstarter to fund the release of his already recorded fourth album in the US. (UK label Lojinx had agreed to release the album in Europe.) Fan contributions reached the target of $8000 within 10 hours and went on to raise a total of $39,645 to support the release and marketing of the album in America. Kickstarter named the campaign Best Music Project in the 2010 Kickstarter Awards.

The new album, titled Four, was released on CD in Europe on October 25 on Lojinx and on November 2 in North America on Bleu's own "The Major Label" imprint. The European digital release date was November 29.

To Hell With You
In November 2012, a crowdfunding for Bleu's fifth record started at pledgemusic.com. The campaign ended October 24, 2013, and was even more successful than Four. One of the many offers from the campaign was the Redhead Record Club. It consisted of re-recorded songs from Redhead for its 10th anniversary. The songs were released individually in digital form. In 2014, the re-recorded collection on CD was made available exclusively for pledgers.

The official release of To Hell With You was January 28, 2014.

Tinker Bell and the Legend of the Neverbeast
In 2014, McAuley wrote and produced all of the soundtrack songs for Disney's Tinker Bell and the Legend of the NeverBeast. KT Tunstall performed vocals on each song, with McAuley lending his vocals for a duet with Tunstall on "1000 Years." The director of the film, Steve Loter, had been listening to McAuley's music on his commute to the studio, and ended up approaching McAuley after one of his shows to ask him to work on the film.

SiX TAPE
With the arrival of his sixth studio album SiX TAPE in August 2021, Bleu again proves his talent for weaving lyrical cunning into exuberant cross-genre pop songs. Featuring his popular single “Love You So,” SiX TAPE finds the “Boston in LA” artist opening up about fatherhood, religion, and “growing up,” while building a passionately curated collage of mostly upbeat pop sounds. With songs inspired by ELO, Prince, Dire Straits, and Carl Carlton, SiX TAPE unabashedly plays like a well-worn 90's cassette mixtape.

“I’m over ‘figuring out who I am’” says Bleu. “I like a mish-mosh of music, just like most people do, and when I’m writing songs for myself, I’m only focused on what will put a shit eating grin on my face and not really worrying about the rest.” 

Another self-produced album, SiX TAPE features collaborations with Lindsey Ray – Nashville based indie ingénue and sync queen, on the album's must-listen duet “Chasin’,” plus co-writers Taylor Locke (Rooney/Sparks/Train) on “Never Believe It” and Isaac Bolivar aka Izzy Fontaine (Seal/Banks) on “My Emo GF.” Mr. McGinty (Jesse McGinty), one of LA's most sought-after session players (Pharrell, Lizzo), makes multiple appearances as a co-writer and instrumentalist on some of the album's most upbeat tracks “Baby By Your Side,” “Love You So,” & “A Crazy Life!”

“If my memory serves, ‘Never Believe It’ was written on a day when the intention was to get a song that I would sing/produce/release,” says Taylor Locke. “But I'm really glad it turned into a Bleu song instead! We spent most of the session developing the Dire Straits-esque track. We knew we were going to have a long, dramatic intro, lots of big tom fills, and then drop down to a riff that would be evocative of Mark Knopfler. For the chorus, we went more ELO. I don't think Bleu and I have ever worked on something together in which we DIDN'T talk about Jeff Lynne a whole lot! Having said that, I'd like to point out that the "science vs religion" content is something Jeff Lynne would never touch. I think it's a satisfying thing that Bleu often does, where you're seemingly inside a well-worn genre, but the subject matter and lyrical tone are totally contemporary and individualistic.”

As for the art of “not chasing” in life, or one's musical career, Lindsey Ray has this to say about the album's only duet, “For me, “Chasin’” is about recognizing what a waste of time it is chasing ANYTHING in life, because truthfully the chase itself is an attempt at controlling something that can’t actually be controlled, and when we try to control things that are out of our control, it will always result in some sort of suffering. I was at a place in my life where this was finally becoming very clear to me and I was making a choice to be done with that way of living.”

SiX TAPE, mostly written well before 2020 and originally meant to be an album of collaborations, has taken its time to come together, and morphed into something new and more personal than it was originally meant to be. Fatherhood put the kai-bosh on the constant collabs, and from this new stage of life comes the intimate immediacy of “Kid Someday,” which encapsulates all the excitement of someone who just found out they're about to have their first child. No less personal though is the record's energetic highlight track “A Crazy Life!” written and recorded with Mr. McGinty entirely remotely during the pandemic. Bleu describes in detail the high and low-lights of living “a crazy life” and following your fam on that journey even if it's “psycho.”

The kaleidoscopic soundscapes presented on this collection perfectly reflect Bleu's musical journey, which includes past albums of power-pop (Redhead, on Columbia Records), pure homage (the Jeff Lynne obsessed collective L.E.O.), and electro indie-pop on his last self-release “To Hell With You.” Bleu is infamous for delivering multi-genre collections, but on this album, it's worn as a badge of honor. Whether it's daring or not, he'd rather entertain you with variety than stay in one lane that would inevitably feel forced by song SiX.

Discography

Songwriting and production discography

Artist discography
 A Bing Bang Holidang (1999)
 Headroom (2000)
 Redhead (2003)
 A Watched Pot (2009)
 Four (2010)
 Besides (2012)
 To Hell With You (2014)
 SiX TAPE (2021)

EP's
 Workaday Day (2000)

Awards
 2002 Boston Music Awards: Best Rock Band (indie label)
 2010 Boston Music Awards: Best Boston Artist That Doesn't Live in Boston
 11th Independent Music Awards: Four – Best Pop Album
 15th Independent Music Awards: Best Music Producer
 15th Independent Music Awards: Black Box – Best Indie Album
 16th Independent Music Awards: Echo Papa – Best Rock EP

References

External links
 Official site.
 Songwriter & Producer Discography
 National Public Radio on Redhead.
 Rolling Stone review of Redhead.
 EMI profile.

American rock musicians
Musicians from Boston
Living people
1975 births
Berklee College of Music alumni
Lojinx artists